Schenkelia ibadanensis is a jumping spider species that lives in Nigeria. The species is named after the Nigerian city Ibadan.

References

Salticidae
Spiders of Africa
Endemic fauna of Nigeria
Spiders described in 2011
Taxa named by Wanda Wesołowska